This is the list of episodes for the Kids' WB series The New Batman Adventures.

Three years after the second season of Batman: The Animated Series ended production, the show was moved from Fox to The WB network, which was airing and producing Superman: The Animated Series. These shows were merged as part of an hour-long segment called The New Batman/Superman Adventures. The WB wanted more episodes of Batman, so 24 new episodes were produced, which featured a different format and more focus on Batman's supporting cast.

In addition to the network's demands, the producers decided to make the show match the graphic style of Superman, so all the characters and objects were redesigned with fewer lines, usually referred to by the fans and creative staff as the "revamp" (or alternately, the "new look"). A similar graphic style was used in the rest of the DCAU later on.

The entire series was released on DVD as Batman: The Animated Series Volume Four (From The New Batman Adventures), most likely to establish the connection with the original series.

Series overview

Episodes

Crossovers

Superman: The Animated Series

Static Shock

See also
 Batman: Mystery of the Batwoman

References

 
 
 
 

The New Batman Adventures
New Batman Adventures
New Batman Adventures episodes
New Batman Adventures
New Batman Adventures
Lists of American children's animated television series episodes